Beverly Behnke is an American curler from Denver, Colorado. She was a three-time national champion in the early 1990s.

Curling career
In 1990 Behnke was named the United States Curling Association's Female Athlete of the Year.

Behnke skipped her team to gold at three National Women's Championships in only a five year span, in 1990, 1993, and 1994. In 1992 they earned silver at Nationals, losing to Lisa Schoeneberg in the final. As national champions they earned the right to represent the United States at the subsequent World Championships. In  and  they finished in eighth and sixth place, respectively. In  Behnke's team finished in eighth place as well, but Behnke missed the tournament due to an injury and instead Sharon O'Brien skipped the team.

Behnke came up short of defending her title in 1995, losing to Schoeneberg in the final again. Schoeneberg yet again beat Behnke in the final of the 1996 National Championship. Behnke's team then again finished in second place to Schoeneberg at the 1997 Olympic Trials.

At the 2001 Olympic Trials Behnke coached Patti Lank's team, who finished in second place.

Teams

Women's

Mixed

References

External links 

American female curlers
American curling champions
Sportspeople from Denver
Year of birth missing (living people)
Living people
21st-century American women